Rajendra Kohar is  an Indian politician. He was elected to the Lok Sabha, the lower house of the Parliament of India as a member of the All India Ganatantra Parishad.

References

1930 births
Lok Sabha members from Odisha
All India Ganatantra Parishad politicians
Living people